Andelot station is a railway station in the commune of Andelot-en-Montagne, in the French department of Jura, in the Bourgogne-Franche-Comté region.

Services
The following services stop at Andelot:

 TER Bourgogne-Franche-Comté:

References

External links 
 
 

Railway stations in Jura (department)